Mario Wynands (born in Wellington, New Zealand) is the co-founder and managing director of Sidhe Interactive and managing director of PikPok.

Wynands has developed popular games and series such as Shatter and the Rugby league series and Rugby Union series.

References

Living people
New Zealand computer programmers
Video game businesspeople
Year of birth missing (living people)